In the history of Christianity, the first seven ecumenical councils include the following: the First Council of Nicaea in 325, the First Council of Constantinople in 381, the Council of Ephesus in 431, the Council of Chalcedon in 451, the Second Council of Constantinople in 553, the Third Council of Constantinople from 680–681 and finally, the Second Council of Nicaea in 787. All of the seven councils were convened in modern-day Turkey.

These seven events represented an attempt by Church leaders to reach an orthodox consensus, restore peace and develop a unified Christendom. Among Eastern Christians the Eastern Orthodox, Oriental Orthodox, and Church of the East (Assyrian) churches and among Western Christians the Roman Catholic, Anglican, Utrecht and Polish National Old Catholic, and some Scandinavian Lutheran churches all trace the legitimacy of their clergy by apostolic succession back to this period and beyond, to the earlier period referred to as the Early Church.

This era begins with the First Council of Nicaea in AD 325, convened by the emperor Constantine I following his victory over Licinius and consolidation of his reign over the Roman Empire. Nicaea I enunciated the Nicene Creed that in its original form and as modified by the First Council of Constantinople of 381 was seen by all later councils as the touchstone of orthodoxy on the doctrine of the Trinity.

The Eastern Orthodox and Roman Catholic Churches accept all seven of these councils as legitimate ecumenical councils. The Non-Chalcedonian Oriental Orthodox Churches accept only the first three, while the Non-Ephesian Church of the East accepts only the first two. There is also one additional council, the so-called Quinisext Council of Trullo held in AD 692 between the sixth and seventh ecumenical councils, which issued organizational, liturgical and canonical rules but did not discuss theology. Only within Eastern Orthodoxy is its authority commonly considered ecumenical, however the Orthodox do not number it among the seven general councils, but rather count it as a continuation of the fifth and sixth. The Roman Catholic Church does not accept the Quinisext Council, but both the Roman magisterium as well as a minority of Eastern Orthodox hierarchs and theological writers consider there to have been further ecumenical councils after the first seven. (see the Fourth Council of Constantinople, Fifth Council of Constantinople, and fourteen additional post-schism ecumenical councils canonical for Catholics).

The councils
These seven ecumenical councils are:

First Council of Nicaea (325)

Emperor Constantine convened this council to settle a controversial issue, the relation between Jesus Christ and God the Father. The Emperor wanted to establish universal agreement on it. Representatives came from across the Empire, subsidized by the Emperor. Previous to this council, the bishops would hold local councils, such as the Council of Jerusalem, but there had been no universal, or ecumenical, council.

The council drew up a creed, the original Nicene Creed, which received nearly unanimous support. The council's description of "God's only-begotten Son", Jesus Christ, as of the same substance with God the Father became a touchstone of Christian Trinitarianism. The council also addressed the issue of dating Easter (see Quartodecimanism and Easter controversy), recognised the right of the See of Alexandria to jurisdiction outside of its own province (by analogy with the jurisdiction exercised by Rome) and the prerogatives of the churches in Antioch and the other provinces and approved the custom by which Jerusalem was honoured, but without the metropolitan dignity.

The Council was opposed by the Arians, and Constantine tried to reconcile Arius, after whom Arianism is named, with the Church. Even when Arius died in 336, one year before the death of Constantine, the controversy continued, with various separate groups espousing Arian sympathies in one way or another. In 359, a double council of Eastern and Western bishops affirmed a formula stating that the Father and the Son were similar in accord with the scriptures, the crowning victory for Arianism. The opponents of Arianism rallied, and the First Council of Constantinople in 381 marked the final victory of Nicene orthodoxy within the Empire, though Arianism had by then spread to the Germanic tribes, among whom it gradually disappeared after the conversion of the Franks to Christianity in 496.

Constantine commissions Bibles

In 331, Constantine I commissioned Eusebius to deliver fifty Bibles for the Church of Constantinople. Athanasius (Apol. Const. 4) recorded Alexandrian scribes around 340 preparing Bibles for Constans. Little else is known, though there is plenty of speculation. For example, it is speculated that this may have provided motivation for canon lists, and that Codex Vaticanus and Codex Sinaiticus are examples of these Bibles. Together with the Peshitta and Codex Alexandrinus, these are the earliest extant Christian Bibles.

First Council of Constantinople (381)

The council approved the current form of the Nicene Creed used in most Oriental Orthodox churches. The Eastern Orthodox Church uses the council's text but with the verbs expressing belief in the singular: Πιστεύω (I believe) instead of Πιστεύομεν (We believe). The Catholic Church's Latin Church and its liturgies also use the singular and, except in Greek, adds two phrases, Deum de Deo (God from God) and Filioque (and the Son). The form used by the Armenian Apostolic Church, which is part of Oriental Orthodoxy, has many more additions. This fuller creed may have existed before the Council and probably originated from the baptismal creed of Constantinople.

The council also condemned Apollinarism, the teaching that there was no human mind or soul in Christ. It also granted Constantinople honorary precedence over all churches save Rome.

The council did not include Western bishops or Roman legates, but it was later accepted as ecumenical in the West.

First Council of Ephesus (431)

Theodosius II called the council to settle the christological controversy surrounding Nestorianism. Nestorius, Patriarch of Constantinople, opposed use of the term Theotokos (Greek: Ἡ Θεοτόκος, "God-Bearer"). This term had long been used by orthodox writers, and it was gaining popularity along with devotion to Mary as Mother of God. He reportedly taught that there were two separate persons in the incarnate Christ, though whether he actually taught this is disputed.

The council deposed Nestorius, repudiated Nestorianism, and proclaimed the Virgin Mary as the Theotokos.

After quoting the Nicene Creed in its original form, as at the First Council of Nicaea, without the alterations and additions made at the First Council of Constantinople, it declared it "unlawful for any man to bring forward, or to write, or to compose a different (ἑτέραν) Faith as a rival to that established by the holy Fathers assembled with the Holy Ghost in Nicæa."

Council of Chalcedon (451)

The council repudiated the Eutychian doctrine of monophysitism, described and delineated the "Hypostatic Union" and two natures of Christ, human and divine; adopted the Chalcedonian Definition. For those who accept it (Eastern Orthodox, Roman Catholics, and most Protestants), it is the Fourth Ecumenical Council (calling the Second Council of Ephesus, which was rejected by this council, the "Robber Synod" or "Robber Council").

Before the council
In November 448, a synod at Constantinople condemned Eutyches for unorthodoxy. Eutyches, archimandrite (abbot) of a large Constantinopolitan monastery, taught that Christ was not consubstantial with humanity.

In 449, Theodosius II summoned a council at Ephesus, where Eutyches was exonerated and returned to his monastery. This council was later overturned by the Council of Chalcedon and labeled "Latrocinium" (i.e., "Robber  Council").

Second Council of Constantinople (553)

This council condemned certain writings and authors which defended the christology of Nestorius. This move was instigated by Emperor Justinian in an effort to conciliate the monophysite Christians, it was opposed in the West, and the Popes' acceptance of the council caused a major schism.

Three Chapters

Prior to the Second Council of Constantinople was a prolonged controversy over the treatment of three subjects, all considered sympathetic to Nestorianism, the heresy that there are two separate persons in the Incarnation of Christ. Emperor Justinian condemned the Three Chapters, hoping to appeal to miaphysite Christians with his anti-Nestorian zeal. Monophysites believe that in the Incarnate Christ there is only one nature (i.e. the divine) not two while miaphysites believe that the two natures of Christ are united as one and are distinct in thought only.

Eastern Patriarchs supported the Emperor, but in the West his interference was resented, and Pope Vigilius resisted his edict on the grounds that it opposed the Chalcedonian decrees.
 Justinian's policy was in fact an attack on Antiochene theology and the decisions of Chalcedon. The pope assented and condemned the Three Chapters, but protests in the West caused him to retract his condemnation. The emperor called the Second Council of Constantinople to resolve the controversy.

Council proceedings
The council, attended mostly by Eastern bishops, condemned the Three Chapters and, indirectly, the Pope Vigilius. It also affirmed Constantinople's intention to remain in communion with Rome.

After the council
Vigilius declared his submission to the council, as did his successor, Pope Pelagius I. The council was not immediately recognized as ecumenical in the West, and Milan and Aquileia even broke off communion with Rome over this issue. The schism was not repaired until the late 6th century for Milan and the late 7th century for Aquileia.

Emperor Justinian's policy failed to reconcile the Monophysites.

Third Council of Constantinople (680–681)
Third Council of Constantinople (680–681): repudiated monothelitism, a doctrine that won widespread support when formulated in 638; the Council affirmed that Christ had both human and divine wills.

Quinisext Council
Quinisext Council (= Fifth-Sixth Council) or Council in Trullo (692) has not been accepted by the Roman Catholic Church. Since it was mostly an administrative council for raising some local canons to ecumenical status, establishing principles of clerical discipline, addressing the Biblical canon, without determining matters of doctrine, the Eastern Orthodox Church does not consider it to be a full-fledged council in its own right, viewing it instead as an extension of the fifth and sixth councils. It gave ecclesiastical sanction to the Pentarchy as the government of the state church of the Roman Empire.

Second Council of Nicaea (787)
Second Council of Nicaea (787). In 753, Emperor Constantine V convened the Synod of Hieria, which declared that images of Jesus misrepresented him and that images of Mary and the saints were idols. The Second Council of Nicaea restored the veneration of icons and ended the first iconoclasm.

Subsequent events

In the 9th century, Emperor Michael III deposed Patriarch Ignatius of Constantinople and Photius was appointed in his place. Pope Nicholas I declared the deposition of Ignatius invalid. After Michael was murdered, Ignatius was reinstated as patriarch without challenge and in 869–870 a council in Constantinople, considered ecumenical in the West, anathematized Photius. With Ignatius' death in 877, Photius became patriarch, and in 879–880 another council in Constantinople, which many Easterners consider ecumenical, annulled the decision of the previous council.

See also
 Ancient church councils (pre-ecumenical) – church councils before the First Council of Nicaea
 Byzantine Empire
 Late ancient history of Christianity
 Outline of the Catholic ecumenical councils
 Synod of Ancyra
 Timeline of Christianity

References

External links
Schaff's The Seven Ecumenical Councils
Fourth-Century Christianity

 
Ecumenical councils
Christian terminology
Christianity in late antiquity